Tursynbay Kulakhmet (born is 27 January 1994) is a Kazakh professional boxer. As an amateur, he won a bronze medal at the 2019 World Championships.

Amateur career

World Championship result
Yekaterinburg 2019
Round of 32: Defeated Milos Bartl (Czech Republic) 5–0
Round of 16: Defeated Javier Martinez (USA) 5–0
Quarter-finals: Defeated Arman Darchinyan (Armenia) 5–0
Semi–finals: Defeated by Eumir Marcial (Philippines) 5–0

Professional career
Kulakhmet made his professional debut against Sagadat Rakhmankul on 23 August 2020. Kulakhmet dominated throughout the bout and at the end of the fourth round, his opponent was forced to retire from the bout after sustaining large amounts of damage.

On 11 November 2020, Kulakhmet fought for the second time as a professional where he was taken the full distance by Macaulay McGowan. Kulakhmet controlled the duration of the bout and secured a comfortable win via unanimous decision.

Professional boxing record

References

External links

 

1994 births
Living people
Kazakhstani male boxers
AIBA World Boxing Championships medalists
Light-middleweight boxers
Middleweight boxers
People from Kyzylorda
21st-century Kazakhstani people